Agariste phrygium is a species of sea snail, a marine gastropod mollusk in the family Fissurellidae, the keyhole limpets and slit limpets.

Distribution
This marine species occurs in the Indian Ocean off KwaZulu-Natal.

References

 Landau B., Marquet R. & Grigis, M. (2003). The Early Pliocene Gastropoda (Mollusca) of Estepona, southern Spain. Part 1: Vetigastropoda. Palaeontos. 3: i-ii, 1-87, pl. 1-19.

External links
 Herbert D.G. & Kilburn R.N. (1986). Taxonomic studies on the Emarginulinae (Mollusca: Gastropoda: Fissurellidae) of southern Africa and Mozambique. Emarginula, Emarginella, Puncturella, Fissurisepta, and Rimula. South Africa Journal of Zoology. 21(1):1-27

Endemic fauna of South Africa
Fissurellidae
Gastropods described in 1986